The 1961 Rutgers Scarlet Knights football team represented Rutgers University in the 1961 NCAA University Division football season. In their second season under head coach John F. Bateman, the Scarlet Knights compiled a perfect 9–0 record, won the Middle Three Conference championship, outscored their opponents 246 to 102, and were ranked No. 15 in the final AP Poll. It was Rutgers's first undefeated season, 92 years after winning the first intercollegiate football game in 1869.

The team's statistical leaders included Bill Speranza with 318 passing yards, Steve Simms with 614 rushing yards, and Lee Curley with 274 receiving yards.

Schedule

See also
 Helmet sticker, as the 1961 Rutgers team was one of the first teams to award them

References

Rutgers
Rutgers
Rutgers Scarlet Knights football seasons
College football undefeated seasons
Rutgers Scarlet Knights football